List of football stadiums by capacity may refer to
 List of American football stadiums by capacity
 List of association football stadiums by capacity
 Australian rules football playing field
 List of cricket grounds by capacity - cricket grounds in Australia are commonly used for Australian football